Catherine Herrera Bautista (born September 2, 1978) profesionally known as Kakai Bautista is a Filipino actress, host, singer, and comedienne.

Career 
Bautista first started out as a theater actress. She was discovered by Ricky Rivero in 2003 after her explosive appearance in the play, Alikabok. Rivero asked her to audition for a drama series directed by Lauri Dyogi titled Kay Tagal Kang Hinintay. She then started appearing on television shows and movies through supporting roles, but was recognized when she appeared as the villainous and evil Matilda in Kampanerang Kuba, Angelina in Kokey and most recently as Marj in the Filipino-Thai movie, Suddenly It's Magic. From 2010 to 2011, she did the horror-comedy sitcom, My Darling Aswang, in TV5 but stayed with ABS-CBN.

Bautista played Mercy in the Philippine Educational Theater Association's musical comedy Rak of Aegis, a role she had been playing since 2013.

Filmography

Television

Film

Theater

References

External links

Living people
Filipino television personalities
Filipino radio personalities
Filipino women comedians
1978 births
Filipino film actresses
Filipino television actresses
Star Magic
21st-century Filipino actresses

ABS-CBN personalities
GMA Network personalities
TV5 (Philippine TV network) personalities